The Kaman K-1125 was a prototype American 12-passenger civil transport helicopter developed by Kaman Aircraft.

Development

In August 1962, Kaman Aircraft first flew a prototype civil transport helicopter. It used components of the earlier Kaman K-600 (H-43) with a new fuselage for 12 passengers. Instead of the twin booms of the earlier Huskie, it had a single boom and a ramp-equipped rear door. Sometimes called the Huskie III, the helicopter was powered by two Boeing YT60 turboshafts which were later replaced with two Pratt & Whitney PT6B-11 engines.

The company tried to interest the United States Air Force in the type and it was evaluated for two years, but with no interest in the type, only the prototype was built.

Specifications

See also

References

Notes

Bibliography

1960s United States civil utility aircraft
1960s United States helicopters
K-1125
Abandoned civil aircraft projects of the United States
Aircraft first flown in 1962